Michele Abeles is an American visual artist and photographer.

Life and work
Michele Abeles was born in 1977 in New York. She graduated with a B.A. in Psychology from Washington University in St. Louis, and has an M.F.A. in photography from Yale University. Her photographs combine everyday objects such as bottles, pots, rocks, and scraps of paper with flashes of bright color and fragments of male bodies.

Exhibitions

Selected solo exhibitions 
Zebra, 47 Canal, New York (2016)
Baby Carriage on Bike or Riot Shield as Carriage, Whitney Museum of American Art, New York (2015)
Find Out What Happens When People Start Getting Real, Sadie Coles HQ, London (2014)
English for Secretaries, 47 Canal Street, New York (2013)
Αγγλικά για Γραμματείς, Andreas Melas & Helena Papadopoulos, Athens (2013)
Frame, Frieze, New York (2012)
Re:Re:Re:Re:Re:, 47 Canal, New York (2011)

Selected group exhibitions 
DIDING – An Interior That Remains an Exterior?, Kunstlerhaus, Graz, Austria (2015)
Second Chances, Aspen Art Museum, Aspen, Colorado, USA (2015)
A World of its Own: Photographic Practices in the Studio, Museum of Modern Art, New York (2014)
Test Pattern, Whitney Museum of Art, New York (2013)
Empire State, curated by Norman Rosenthal and Alex Gartenfeld, Palazzo delle Esposizioni, Rome, Italy  (2013)
Speculations on Anonymous Materials, Fridericianum, Kassel, Germany (2013)
New Photography 2012, Museum of Modern Art, New York (2012)
Greater New York 2010, MOMA PS1, Long Island City (NY) (2010)

References

Further reading 
Annie Godfrey Larmon, Michele Abeles at 47 Canal, Artforum, Feb 2017.
Martha Schwendener, Michele Abeles, The New York Times, Dec. 8, 2016.
Michele Abeles, Isabelle Graw, Michele Abeles: ZEBRA (London / New York: Sadie Coles HQ / 47 Canal, 2016).
Michele Abeles, Sara Cwynar, Jon Rafman and Travess Smalley, ‘Recoding Images: A Round-Table Interview Curated by Lauren Cornell’, Mousse, no. 43, Milan, March 2014, pp. 238–253.
Sara Knelman, ‘Michele Abeles’, frieze, issue 167, London, November – December 2014, pp. 174–175.
Sean Ashton, ‘Michele Abeles: Find Out What Happens When People Start Getting Real’ ArtReview, London, December 2014, p. 110.
Roberta Smith, ‘Art in Review: Michele Abeles: English for Secretaries’, The New York Times, New York, 17 May 2013, p. C24.
David Velasco, ‘Michele Abeles’, Artforum, New York, November 2011, pp. 258–261.

Photographers from New York (state)
Yale School of Art alumni
Year of birth missing (living people)
Living people
Washington University in St. Louis alumni
21st-century American photographers
21st-century American women photographers